Thoguluva Meenatchi Iyengar Soundararajan (24 March 1923 – 25 May 2013), popularly known as TMS, was an Indian Carnatic musician and a playback singer in Tamil cinema for over six and a half decades. He sang over 10,138 songs from 3,162 films, including devotional, semi-classical, Carnatic, classical and light music songs. He gave classical concerts starting in 1943.

He lent his voice to actors and thespians in the Tamil film industry such as M. G. Ramachandran, Sivaji Ganesan, N. T. Rama Rao, Gemini Ganesan, S. S. Rajendran, Jaishankar, Ravichandran, A. V. M. Rajan, R. Muthuraman, Nagesh, Sivakumar, Kantha Rao, Rajkumar, Prem Nazir and A. Nageswara Rao. He also gave his voice to many new generation actors like Kamal Haasan, Rajinikanth, Vijayakanth, Satyaraj, Rajesh, Prabhu, and Vijaya Kumar, in addition to other known and unknown heroes and supporting actors like M.R. Radha, K R Ramaswami, T. Rajendar, V.K. Ramaswami, Thengai Sreenivasan, M.N. Nambiar, Thangavelu, Y.G. Mahendran, R.S. Manohar, S.V. Ashokan, Ranjan, Narasimha Bharathi, Sahasra Namam, T S Balayya, Jagayya, Nagayya, Thyagarajan, Sreenath, Shankar etc.

In a career spanning over six and half decades, he rode like a colossus and dominated Tamil music for decades. Besides primarily Tamil, he also sang in other languages including Sourashtra, Kannada, Telugu, Hindi, and Malayalam. He was a lyricist and music composer for many devotional songs. He was the music director for the film Bala Parikshai. His peak period as a male playback singer in the South Indian film industry was from 1955 to 1985. His first film song was in 1946, at the age of 24, and his last was with P. Susheela during 2010 at the age of 88. TMS died on 25 May 2013 at his residence in Mandaveli, Chennai due to illness. He was 90 years old.

Early life 
Soundararajan was born in Madurai, the second son of Meenakshi Iyengar and Venkatammaa on 24 March 1923. He was born in a prominent Saurashtra Brahmin family and his elder brother was a scholar.

He trained his voice starting at age seven. He first studied Carnatic music from Chinnakonda Sarangapani Bhagavathar, a music teacher from Sourashtra High School, Madurai. Later, he learned Carnatic music from Arayakkudi Rajamani Iyer and started giving stage concerts at the age of 23. His first Carnatic musical concert was at SathGuru Samajam, Madurai in 1945 with violinist C. R. Mani and Mridangist S. S. Vijaya Ratnam accompanying him on the instruments. He started singing in stage concerts in the voice of the then-famous classical singer and actor M. K. Thyagaraja Bhagavathar.

Personal life 
He married Sumithra in 1946 with whom he had three sons and three daughters. He lived in his home at Mandaveli, Chennai, Tamil Nadu until his death.

Early work 
Soundararajan was initially rejected by music composers and recording technicians because his voice was cracking and showed variation in higher pitches. He started working in the house of Sundar Rao Nadkarni, a director in the Central Studios, hoping to get a chance to sing in movies. The director recommended him to S. M. Subbaiah Naidu. In 1946, Naidu gave TMS an opportunity to sing five songs in the style of M. K. Thyagaraja Bhagavathar for a film of P. V. Narasimha Bharathi: Krishna Vijayam. Though the songs were noted since 1946, the film was released in 1950. One of his songs in that movie, "Raathey Ennai Vittu Pogathedi," became a hit and he was paid Rs 625. In the same year (1950), G. Ramanathan had him sing "Annamitta Veettiley" for an unknown actor in the film Manthiri Kumari. In 1951, TMS acted and sang "Theeraatha Thuyaralley" in the film Devagi again by G. Ramanathan.

In 1952, S. Dakshinamurthi gave TMS two duet songs in the movie Valaiyapathi – "Kulir Thaamarai Poigaiyai Kanden" and "Kulungidum Poovilellaam" – both with singer K. Jamuna Rani where TMS had an opportunity to sing songs written by the renowned Tamil poet Bharathidasan. G. Ramanathan had TMS and K. Rani sing for Kalyani. In 1953, when Albela was dubbed into Tamil, the music director C. Ramchandra had two duets by TMS and M. S. Rajeswari: "Joraga Paadi Anbaaga Aadi" and "Thozhi Un Kann Edhire Kodi". Even though these songs were well received, there were no further chances for TMS for a while.

Then TMS went to HMV studio where K. V. Mahadevan recorded two devotional songs for which he was paid just Rs 80. Mahadevan told TMS to seek a chance with AVM Productions which was looking for new voices. TMS sang two songs for the film Chella Pillai. One was a solo ("Podanum Kulla Podanum") and the other was a duet with M.S. Rajeswari ("Naadu Nadakkira Nadayiley") under R. Sudarsanam's composition. The film was released in 1955. These music composers helped and trained the determined and ambitious TMS, who was able to overcome his voice problems to a good degree with time.

In 1954, A. Maruthakasi recommended TMS to sing in Aruna Pictures' Thookku Thookki. Till then C. S. Jayaraman used to sing playback for Sivaji Ganesan and Sivaji doubted the suitability of his voice. TMS offered to sing three songs free. TMS and Sivaji Ganesan were introduced to each other and, in the short conversation that followed, TMS studied the voice of Sivaji Ganesan. TMS sang "Sundari Soundari" and "Eraatha Malaithanile", closely imitating Sivaji Ganesan. G. Ramanathan, who was the music director for that film, was so pleased that he gave TMS the chance to sing all the Sivaji Ganesan songs in that production.

In the same year, T. R. Ramanna and T. R. Rajakumari started RR Films. As the film Koondukkili was under production stage, TMS had originally been given a chance to sing only in a chorus. Koondukkili was the only film where MGR and Sivaji acted together. Tanjai Ramayah Dass was very impressed with the golden voice of TMS and asked the story and dialogue writer Vindhan to give a chance to TMS to sing a full solo. TMS sang "Konjum Kiliyana Pennai" under K. V. Mahadevan's composition for Sivaji Ganesan.

When the song was recorded, MGR heard it and was so impressed that he wanted TMS to become his permanent playback singer. TMS was used in MGR's next movie Malaikkallan. Though he first recorded a song for the film Manthiri Kumari starring M. G. Ramachandran (MGR) in 1950, the song that announced the arrival of TMS on the big screen was "Ethanai Kaalamthaan Ematruvaar Indha Naattile" written by Tanjai Ramaiyah Dass and composed by S. M. Subbaiah Naidu. for M.G.R. During this period, TMS got an opportunity to sing in films like Kalvanin Kadhali, Vedan Kannappa, Rishi Sringer and Neela Malai Thirudan. TMS was the beneficiary of the first stereo recording in South India for a Tamil devotional song titled "Mannanalum Thiruchenthooril Mannaven".

From 1955 onward Sivaji insisted that TMS sing for him. Since then, TMS was mainly singing playback for the superstars MGR and Sivaji till the end of 1978 and 1995 respectively. He adopted styles while singing for each actor that synchronized very well with their voices.

His first musical concert abroad was in Malaysia in 1957. He continued to perform all over the world for almost 50 years till 2007, after which he restricted singing live on stage due to health reasons. He has two sons who have voices similar to their father and have sung songs of TMS all over the world in concerts since 1980 till 2012, often with their father. The sons continue to do TMS concerts after the death of their father.

Though he has worked with all music directors of South India, most of his hit songs were composed by music directors M. S. Viswanathan, K. V. Mahadevan, and the Viswanathan–Ramamoorthy duo.

TMS starred as an actor in a few Tamil films such as Pattinathar, Arunagirinathar, Kallum Kaniyagum and Kaviraja Kalamegam. He produced the movie Kallum Kaniyagum with singer A. L. Raghavan. TMS appeared in guest roles in movies such as Devaki, Navagraha Nayaki, Pennarasi, Server Sundaram, Thiru Neelakandar, Swami Ayyappan, Shanmugapriya and Deivam.

After the release Thai Nadu and Ghana Paravai, he concentrated more on live concerts and sang in very few films. He was not happy with the lyrics and music style in the films and gave opportunities for newcomers. The film song, "Paatu Ondu Ketaal", performed by him for a Sri Lankan Tamil film named Sooriyan, was recorded in 2007 though it is yet to be released. He sang a song for an album in 2008 "Netrichutti" at the age of 86 and a song named "Kutraalam Aruvi" for the album Song for Daughter, under the music of L.Sakthinathan, which was very well recognized in the industry in 2008. The last film song during October 2010 with P. Susheela, composed by MSV for a film "Valibum Sutrum Ulagam" was well recognized irrespective of his 88 years of age. In 2010, he rendered his voice for the song "Pirapokum ella yuyirukum" in the Tamil Semmozhi Meet Anthem, which was composed by A. R. Rahman. He worked with 74 music directors ranging from S. M. Subbaiah Naidu to A. R. Rahman.

Famous Kannada/Telugu songs 
TMS has sung many Kannada film songs, but the fun-filled song "Baare baare nanna hinde hinde" from the 1956 movie Sadaarame is still popular in Karnataka. He also had a lot of popular film songs in Telugu.

Collaborations

Playback singers 
He sang with other male singers, such as Ghantasala, Seerkazhi Govindarajan, P. B. Sreenivas, Balamurali Krishna, S. C. Krishnan, C. S. Jayaraman, Tharapuram Sundarajan, P. Jayachandran, Thiruchi Loganathan, V. N. Sundaram, A. L. Raghavan, K. J. Yesudas S. P. Balasubrahmanyam, Kovai Soundarrajan, Nagore E. M. Hanifa, Malaysia Vasudevan, U. R. Chandra, T. R. Mahalingam, T. A. Mothi, M. M. Muthu, Suguna Kumar, V. R. Rajagopalan, V. T. Rajagopalan, S. S. Mani Bhagavathar, G. K. Venkatesh, Sai Baba, S. V. Ponnuswami, J. V. Raghavalu, M. Raju, and Master Maharajan.

He sang duets with many female singers such as P. Suseela, P. Leela, Jikki, L. R. Eswari, S. Janaki, Vani Jairam, M. S. Rajeswari, K. Jamuna Rani, M. L. Vasanthakumari, U. R. Jeevarathinam, N. L. Ganasaraswathi, T. V. Rathnam, K.B.Sundarambal, Radha Jayalakshmi, Soolamangalam Jayalakshmi, Soolamangalam Rajalakshmi, R. Balasaraswathi Devi, A. P. Komala, P. Madhuri, K. Rani, B. S. Sasirekha, S. P. Sailaja, Lalitha, T. S. Bhagavathi, Suvarna, Vasantha, Sobha Chandrasekhar, L. R. Anjala, Kausalya, T. K. Kala, A. G. Ratnamala, Athmasha, Udutha Sarojam and R. Parvathi. Among them, he had the greatest collaboration with P. Susheela, with whom he sang 727 duets in Tamil.

He sang duets with singing actors such as J. P. Chandrababu, K. R. Ramasamy, V. Nagayya, P. Bhanumathi, S. Varalakshmi, Jayalalithaa, Manorama and Bharathi.

Awards and honours 

 Mathiyakathin Gana Thalaivar
 Kala Ratnam
 Gana Ratnam
 Arul Isai Sidhar
 Navarasa Bhava Nalina Gana Varshini
 Ganamritha Varshini
 Sathanai Chakravarhti
 Bharathiya Isai Kanal
 Bharathiya Isia Megham
 Gana Kuralon
 Then Isai Thendral
 Padma Shri (2003)
 Kalaimamani
 Padakar Thilakam
 Singha Kuralon
 Bharat Kalachar award
 Isai Chakravarthi
 Gnanakala Bharathi title
 Geethavaari title
 Karpagath Tharu Mannar
 Geetharanjana Vaarithi
 Arutpa Isaimani title
 Honorary Doctorate from Belgium.
 Kural Arasar Pattam
 EzhilIsai Mannar award from former Chief Minister M. Karunanidhi (1970)
 IsaiKadal Pattam from Kavi Arasar Kannadasan (1969)
 MGR Gold Medal award
 Former Chief Minister Arignar Annadurai Recognition Award (1964)
 Former Chief Minister Tamil Nadu Kamaraj Nadar Recognition Award
 Chief Minister Jayalalitha recognition award
 M. K. Thyagaraja Bhagavathar Lifetime Achievement Award, Tamil Nadu
 Tamil Nadu Musical Artist Lifetime Achievements Award (2005)
 Tamil Film Fans Award, 23 times in the early 1950s, 1960s and 1970s
 P. Susheela Award
 Mega TV Amutha Ghanam Recognition Award (2004)
 Lifetime achievement for MGR Memorial Award
 Lifetime achievement for Shivaji Memorial Award
 Sourashtra Community Recognition Award
 Karuppai Muppanar recognition award (1992)
 Periyar RamaSwami Naikkor recognition (1959)
 Raj TV for Raja Geetham Recognition Award (2006)
 Malaysian Tamil Fans Recognition Award
 Singapore Tamil Fans Recognition Award
 France, Germany, Switzerland, Italy, the Netherlands, Belgium and Austria Tamil Fans recognition award
 United Kingdom Tamil fans recognition award
 20th Century Top Playback Singer from South African city mayor through Tamil fans, 1995
 USA Tamil fans from states recognition award
 Tamil Nadu Chief minister M. Karunanidhi recognition award at Madurai, Alagiri, 2010
 SriLankan awards from President, Prime Minister level through Tamil Group more than several times
 Tamil Fans recognition award from Canada
 Australian Tamil Fans appreciation awards in Sydney, Brisbane, Melbourne, and Perth
 Kairali Swaralaya Yesudas Lifetime Achievement Award, 2012
 Government of India released memorial stamp for 10 legendary singers of India, including TMS from south India
 Tamil Nadu State Awards, many many years continuously in the 1960s, 1970s and 1980s'
 Pesum Padam, award over 24 times, including consecutive annual awards from 1954 to 1969
 Former Chief Minister Tamil Nadu M.D. Bhakthavalsalam Recognition Award (1963)
 Tamil Nadu Iyal, Isai Nadaka Manthram, First Chairman.

Discography

References

External links 
 

1922 births
2013 deaths
Musicians from Madurai
Indian male playback singers
Recipients of the Padma Shri in arts
Tamil singers
Tamil playback singers
Tamil Nadu State Film Awards winners
20th-century Indian male classical singers
Singers from Tamil Nadu
Male actors in Tamil cinema
Male actors from Madurai
20th-century Indian male actors
21st-century Indian male actors